(born August 25, 1940 in Chiba Prefecture) is a Japanese swimmer and Olympic medalist. He competed at the 1964 Summer Olympics in Tokyo, winning a bronze medal in 4 x 200 metre freestyle relay.

References

1940 births
Living people
Olympic swimmers of Japan
Olympic bronze medalists for Japan
Swimmers at the 1964 Summer Olympics
Olympic bronze medalists in swimming
Japanese male freestyle swimmers
Medalists at the 1964 Summer Olympics
20th-century Japanese people